Tamara Larrea Peraza (born November 25, 1973 in Havana) is a female beach volleyball player from Cuba, who won the gold medal in the women's beach team competition at the 2003 Pan American Games in Santo Domingo, Dominican Republic, partnering Dalixia Fernández. She represented her native country at two consecutive Summer Olympics, starting in 2000 in Sydney, Australia.

References

External links
 
 
 

1973 births
Living people
Cuban beach volleyball players
Women's beach volleyball players
Beach volleyball players at the 2000 Summer Olympics
Beach volleyball players at the 2004 Summer Olympics
Beach volleyball players at the 2008 Summer Olympics
Olympic beach volleyball players of Cuba
Beach volleyball players at the 1999 Pan American Games
Beach volleyball players at the 2003 Pan American Games
Beach volleyball players at the 2007 Pan American Games
Sportspeople from Havana
Pan American Games gold medalists for Cuba
Pan American Games silver medalists for Cuba
Pan American Games medalists in volleyball
Central American and Caribbean Games gold medalists for Cuba
Competitors at the 2006 Central American and Caribbean Games
Central American and Caribbean Games medalists in beach volleyball
Medalists at the 2003 Pan American Games
Medalists at the 2007 Pan American Games
21st-century Cuban women